Christopher Caldwell is an American political aide and government official, formerly serving as the Federal Co-Chairman of the Delta Regional Authority from 2018 to 2021. Caldwell previously served as the director of special projects for U.S. Senator John Boozman. The DRA is responsible for bolstering economic development in a 252-county region of the Mississippi Delta spanning eight states. Caldwell served as campaign manager for Boozman's 2016 re-election campaign and as the political director for Boozman's 2010 U.S. Senate campaign. He has also served on several other campaigns, including Mike Huckabee's 2007 presidential bid and Tim Hutchinson's 2002 U.S. Senate campaign. The U.S. Senate confirmed Caldwell's nomination to the DRA  in December 2017 and he was sworn in to office on January 12, 2018. He left office in January 2021. He now serves as campaign manager for Republican gubernatorial nominee Sarah Huckabee Sanders in the 2022 Arkansas Gubernatorial Election.

References

1963 births
Living people
People from Birmingham, Alabama
Arkansas Republicans
Trump administration personnel
University of Arkansas alumni